Lati Kola (also Romanized as Latī Kolā) is a village in Harazpey-ye Jonubi Rural District, in the Central District of Amol County, Mazandaran Province, Iran. At the 2019 census, its population was 370, in 90 families.

References 

Populated places in Amol County